ECA may refer to:

Companies
 ECA International, a consulting firm
 ECA Records
 Encana
 Eurocypria Airlines
 European Coastal Airlines

Education
 ACES Educational Center for the Arts, in New Haven, Connecticut, United States
 Edinburgh College of Art, in Scotland
 Education Corporation of America, a company running schools in southern American states
 Emmanuel Christian Academy (Ohio), in Springfield, Ohio
 Escuela Campo Alegre, an American international school in Caracas, Venezuela
 Evangel Christian Academy, in Shreveport, Louisiana
 Evangelical Christian Academy (Madrid, Spain)
 School of Communications and Arts, University of São Paulo, in Brazil

Government
 Bureau of Educational and Cultural Affairs, of the United States Department of State
 Economic Cooperation Administration, a former United States government agency 
 European Court of Auditors, an institution of the European Union
 Executive Council of Alberta, the Canadian province's executive branch
 Export credit agency
 United Nations Economic Commission for Africa, a commission to encourage economic cooperation among African countries

Law
 Essential Commodities Act, of the Parliament of India
 European Communities Act 1972 (Ireland), of the Oireachtas (Irish Parliament)
 European Communities Act 1972 (UK), of the Parliament of the United Kingdom

Medicine and anatomy
 ECA stack, a combination of ephedrine, caffeine, and aspirin
 Emergency care assistant, in the United Kingdom
 External carotid artery
 External control arm clinical trial

Science and technology
 Elementary cellular automaton
 Enterprise Collaboration Architecture, a standard of the Object Management Group
 Ethyl cyanoacrylate
 Event condition action, a principle to define triggers in a database

Sports 
 European Canoe Association
 European Club Association, an association of European football clubs

Other uses
 Easington Catchment Area, a group of natural gas fields in the North Sea
 Ecologically Critical Area, in Bangladesh
 Emission Control Area, sea areas with regulated sulfur and nitrous oxides emission caps
 Electrical Contractors' Association, a British industry association 
 Entertainment Consumers Association, an American consumer advocacy organization
 Europe and Central Asia, an abbreviation used by the World Bank
 European Cockpit Association, a trade union
 Evangelical Church Alliance
 Luiz Eça (1936–1992), Brazilian pianist